Arthur E. Brides (October 31, 1885 – September 26, 1937) was an American football player and coach.  He served as the head coach at the University of North Carolina at Chapel Hill from 1909 to 1910 and at Massachusetts Agricultural College—now the University of Massachusetts Amherst—from 1912 to 1915, compiling a career college football record of 20–23–4.

Brides was born on October 31, 1885, in Brockton, Massachusetts.  He died on September 26, 1937, in Stoughton, Massachusetts, of a heart attack.

Head coaching record

References

External links
 

1885 births
1937 deaths
American football guards
American football tackles
Columbia Lions football coaches
North Carolina Tar Heels football coaches
UMass Minutemen football coaches
Yale Bulldogs football coaches
Yale Bulldogs football players
Sportspeople from Brockton, Massachusetts
Coaches of American football from Massachusetts
Players of American football from Massachusetts